is a mecha action anime series created by Sony Pictures Entertainment Japan with animation by AIC Spirits and Digital Frontier. Though Hiroyuki Kanbe is the main director of the show, Shinji Aramaki is solely responsible for the creation and conception of the show.  G4 aired the show in the United States, but later pulled it from the schedule after only four episodes.

Plot
With most of the Earth's cities underwater due to the onset of global warming followed by a third world war which brought calamity and turmoil to the people, various PMCs are one of the few remaining organizations able to provide law enforcement and self-defense protection for cities that are trying to rebuild again from the war and the floods. One of the PMCs providing law enforcement is the Arqon Global Security corporation, responsible for protecting Fort Daiva City from terrorism, armed crimes, and renegade unmanned machines called Bug Mechs, by deploying its elite military unit called Viper led by its operatives called Blademen.

Cast

Mecha

Maneuver Blades
Maneuver Blades are humanoid mecha used by Blademen that are capable of transforming into motorcycles. These mecha are primarily armed with an assault rifle, a rocket launcher in each shoulder, and a 6-tube missile pod on the left shoulder. While in motorcycle form they can easily reach speeds over 80 kilometers an hour. Most maneuver blades are equipped with a secondary weapon depending on the combat tactics of the pilot including a grenade launcher attachment to the assault rifle, heat chainsaw, a gatling gun, or a sniper rifle. The head of the mecha also serves as cameras with highly detailed targeting scanners.

Bug Mechs
Bug Mechs are unmanned mecha based after insects that were used as autonomous war machines during the great war. However, due to their AI they became unable to differentiate between friend and foe and became very difficult to be reprogrammed. The bug mechs are usually armed with gatling guns and homing mines called Spider Mines or "Ticker Bombs" in which they use their spider-like legs to attach to enemies before exploding. As demonstrated in episodes 2 and 11, bug mechs are very versatile and can easily move around in dark and underground environments. Five types of bug mechs were used during the events of the series and with the exception of the sputnik every bug mech returns in the final episode by the military.

Mega Soma: Armed with twin gatling guns, ticker bombs, spider mines, and spear legs.
Gelus: Armed with twin gatling guns.
Sputnik: Armed with twin gatling guns and spear legs.
Acromantis: Armed with scythe arms, gatling gun, and spider mines.
Mobilius: Armed with spider mines, back missile pod, a left arm machine gun, and a right arm claw.

Production
News of Viper's Creed went on the internet when screenplay writer Ai Ōta announced on her official blog that Shinji Aramaki would be involved in the creation of the series. An announcement was then circulated on November 11, 2008 that Hiroyuki Kanbe would direct the series with Shinji Aramaki being named as the main chief director. The roles of Saiki Cryde and Kariya Sakurako were given to voice actors Takaya Kuroda and Megumi Toyoguchi, respectively.

A special advance screening was shown on Animax on December 30, 2008. Viper's Creed was subsequently broadcast on Animax and BS11 channels, the former being the first to air it on January 6, 2009 at 10:00 PM before BS11 aired it on its channel on January 10, 2009 at 11:30 PM. The opening song is called R.O.C.K. by iLL with a  CD single released on January 28, 2009 while the ending song Ai no Oto is sung in English by moumoon. It was released as a CD single and as a CD single with a DVD on February 25, 2009.

An official podcast webpage dedicated to Viper's Creed was subsequently established.

Media

DVD
Region 2 DVDs of Viper's Creed have been released in Japan with 3 episodes each. As of October 2009, Volume 1 was released on August 5, 2009 with Volume 2 released on September 2, 2009. Volume 3 was released on October 7, 2009.

In 2018, Mill Creek Entertainment released the complete series in Region 1 as part of their Anime 3-Series Collection along with Kurozuka and Ultraviolet: Code 044.

References

Episodes

External links
 Official BS11 Site  
 Official Blog  
 

2009 anime television series debuts
Animax
Anime International Company
Anime with original screenplays
Cyberpunk anime and manga
Mecha anime and manga
Post-apocalyptic anime and manga